Nancy is a studio album by Nancy Sinatra, released on Reprise Records in 1969. It peaked at number 91 on the Billboard 200 chart.

Track listing

Personnel
Credits adapted from liner notes.

 Nancy Sinatra – vocals
 The Blossoms – backing vocals
 B. J. Baker Singers – backing vocals
 Sid Sharp – strings
 Roy Caton – trumpet
 Jim Horn – flute
 Don Randi – piano
 Red Rhodes – pedal steel guitar
 Al Casey – guitar
 Jerry McGee – guitar
 Chuck Berghofer – double bass
 Carol Kaye – bass guitar
 Jerry Scheff – bass guitar
 Hal Blaine – drums
 Billy Strange – production
 Les Taylor – orchestration

Charts

References

External links
 
 

1969 albums
Nancy Sinatra albums
Albums produced by Billy Strange
Reprise Records albums
Sundazed Records albums